Immanuel Lutheran College (ILC) is a co-educational Christian private school in Buderim, a suburb of the Sunshine Coast in Queensland, Australia. Since its opening in 1979, the college enrolment has grown from 63 students to over 850, ranging from Kindergarten (Prep) to Year 12. The school has a large number of musical ensembles which, have also consistently won major awards in statewide competitions. The school is owned and operated by the Queensland District of the Lutheran Church of Australia.

The college campus occupies a large, wooded, and picturesque site on the lower slopes of Buderim Mountain, a short distance from the famous surfing beaches of Mooloolaba and Alexandra Headland. Sporting facilities include a swimming pool, multiple basketball courts and sporting ovals. The school also features a library, a lecture theater and a chapel on venue.

Houses
Students are allocated to one of four sporting and cultural Houses; there are no mascots. These houses are as follows:

Scholarships
Immanuel currently offers a variety of scholarships which cater for different types of excellence. These range from Academic to Sport. The College offers these scholarships in years 7, 8, and 11 and advertises them annually.

 The Vic Walker Memorial Scholarship: Open to graduates of Immanuel Lutheran College who undertake to complete their degree at the University of the Sunshine Coast. Covers first-year HECS fees up to $5000.
 Shane Hill Memorial Rugby Scholarship
 Coastline BMW Netball Scholarship
 The Auricht Music Awards
 Various Music Bursaries and Scholarships
 Academic Scholarships (applicable for certain grades)

Notable former students
 Charles Abel, Papua New Guinean politician and government minister
 Melanie Schlanger - Australian representative freestyle swimmer for the 2008 and 2012 Olympic Games
 Alana Boyd - Australian representative to the 2012 Olympics in Athletics
Tom Cox - Professional rugby player and fashionista. 
Nick D'Arcy - Champion butterfly swimmer; Olympic and Commonwealth Games representative.
Benjamin Law - Journalist and television screenwriter
Ashley Noffke - Professional cricketer
Emily Orchard - Senior forensic scientist, Victorian Institute of Forensic Medicine.
Michelle Law-Writer and Screenwriter

References

External links
 Immanuel Lutheran College Website

Private secondary schools in Queensland
Private primary schools in Queensland
Lutheran schools in Australia
Buderim
Schools on the Sunshine Coast, Queensland
Educational institutions established in 1979
1979 establishments in Australia
High schools and secondary schools affiliated with the Lutheran Church
Elementary and primary schools affiliated with the Lutheran Church